Jane Margaret O'Brien is a professor of chemistry and president emerita of St. Mary's College of Maryland. She served as president from 1996 to 2009. "Maggie", as she was called by students at St. 
Mary's, received her BS in biochemistry at Vassar College in 1975, and her PhD in Chemistry at the University of Delaware in 1981.

External links
 Profile of Jane Margaret O'Brien

St. Mary's College of Maryland
Vassar College alumni
University of Delaware alumni
Year of birth missing (living people)
Living people
American women chemists
Women heads of universities and colleges
21st-century American women